The Lutheran World Federation (LWF) is a global communion of national and regional  Lutheran denominations headquartered in the Ecumenical Centre in Geneva, Switzerland. The federation was founded in the Swedish city of Lund in the aftermath of the Second World War in 1947 to coordinate the activities of the many differing Lutheran churches. Since 1984, the member churches are in pulpit and altar fellowship, with common doctrine as the basis of membership and mission activity.

The LWF now has 149 member church bodies in 99 countries representing over 77 million Lutherans; as of 2022, it is the sixth-largest Christian communion (see list of denominations by membership). The LWF acts on behalf of its member churches in areas of common interest such as ecumenical and interfaith relations, theology, humanitarian assistance, human rights, communication, and the various aspects of mission and development work.

The Department for World Service is the LWF's humanitarian and development arm. It has programmes in 24 countries and is the UNHCR ninth largest implementing partner. The LWF is a member of ACT Alliance.

On 31 October 1999 in Augsburg, Germany, the Lutheran World Federation signed the Joint Declaration on the Doctrine of Justification with the Roman Catholic Church. The statement is an attempt to narrow the theological divide between the two faiths. The declaration also states that the mutual condemnations between 16th-century Catholic church and Lutheranism no longer apply. A similar event took place in Lund Cathedral at the 500th anniversary of the beginning of the Protestant Reformation when Pope Francis visited Scania, Sweden's southernmost province that originally was Danish.

119 of the 145 member churches (80%) ordain women as ministers.

History 
The LWF was founded at Lund, Sweden, in 1947. Based in Geneva, Switzerland, it replaced the more informal Lutheran World Convention, which had been founded in 1924. The goal was to coordinate international activities of the many Lutheran churches, to provide a forum for discussions on theological and organizational issues, and to assist in philanthropy, missionary activity, and exchange of students and professors. A key leader was Executive Secretary Sylvester C. Michelfelder (1889–1951), representing the American Lutheran Church. He had been a leader in organizing $45 million in American help for the rebuilding of Protestant churches in Germany after 1945. By the time of his death in 1951, the federation represented 52 churches in 25 countries.

Largest churches 
The 20 largest member churches are (with number of members in millions; 2021 statistics):

 Ethiopian Evangelical Church Mekane Yesus (10.4)
 Evangelical Lutheran Church in Tanzania (7.9)
 Church of Sweden (5.9)
 Batak Christian Protestant Church (4.5)
 Church of Denmark (4.3)
 Malagasy Lutheran Church (4.0)
 Evangelical Lutheran Church of Finland (3.8)
 Church of Norway (3.7)
 Evangelical Lutheran Church in America (3.6)
 Andhra Evangelical Lutheran Church (3.0)
 Evangelical Lutheran Church of Hanover, Germany (2.6)
 Evangelical Lutheran Church in Bavaria, Germany (2.3)
 The Lutheran Church of Christ in Nigeria (2.2)
 Evangelical Lutheran Church in Northern Germany (2.1)
 Evangelical Lutheran Church in Württemberg (2.0)
 Protestant Church in the Netherlands (1.7)
 Evangelical Lutheran Church in Namibia (0.9)
 Evangelical Church in Central Germany (0.7)
 Evangelical Lutheran Church of Saxony (0.7)
 Evangelical Church of the Lutheran Confession in Brazil (0.6)
 Evangelical Lutheran Church in Southern Africa (0.6)

Federation officials

President
The President is the federation's chief official representative and spokesperson. He or she presides at meetings of the Assembly, Council and Meeting of Officers, and oversees the life and work of the federation in consultation with the General Secretary.

General Secretary
The Lutheran World Federation Council elects the General Secretary, who is appointed for a seven-year term. The person appointed is eligible for re-election. The General Secretary conducts the business of the federation assisted by the Communion Office Leadership Team, comprising department and unit heads appointed by the council, and carries out the decisions of the Assembly and Council. On 19 June the LWF Council elected Estonian theologian Rev. Anne Burghardt as the next General Secretary. She is the first woman to serve in this role. Rev. Burghardt will assume office on 1 November.

Members
This map shows the global distribution of Lutheranism based on The LWF 2013 membership data.

Sorted by country in alphabetical order

 Angola
Evangelical Lutheran Church of Angola
 Argentina
Evangelical Church of the River Plate (includes Paraguay and Uruguay)
United Evangelical Lutheran Church
 Australia
Lutheran Church of Australia (includes New Zealand) – associate member church (also an associate member of the International Lutheran Council)
 Austria
Evangelical Church of the Augsburg Confession in Austria
 Bangladesh
Bangladesh Lutheran Church
Bangladesh Northern Evangelical Lutheran Church
 Belarus
Evangelical Lutheran Church in Russia and Other States
 Belgium
Lutheran Church of Belgium: Arlon and Christian Mission
 Bolivia
Bolivian Evangelical Lutheran Church
German-Speaking Evangelical Lutheran Congregation in Bolivia
 Botswana
Evangelical Lutheran Church in Botswana
 Brazil
Evangelical Church of the Lutheran Confession in Brazil
 Cameroon
Church of the Lutheran Brethren of Cameroon
Evangelical Lutheran Church of Cameroon
 Canada
Evangelical Lutheran Church in Canada
 Central African Republic
Lutheran Church of the Central African Republic
 Chile
Evangelical Lutheran Church in Chile
Lutheran Church in Chile
 China (Hong Kong SAR)
The Chinese Rhenish Church Hong Kong Synod
The Evangelical Lutheran Church of Hong Kong
Hong Kong and Macau Lutheran Church
Tsung Tsin Mission of Hong Kong
 Colombia
Evangelical Lutheran Church of Colombia
St Matthew's Lutheran Congregation
St. Martin's Lutheran Congregation
 Congo, Democratic Republic of
Evangelical Lutheran Church in Congo
 Costa Rica
Evangelical Lutheran Church of Costa Rica
Lutheran Costarican Church
 Croatia
Evangelical Church in the Republic of Croatia
 Czechia
Evangelical Church of Czech Brethren
Silesian Evangelical Church of the Augsburg Confession
 Denmark
Evangelical Lutheran Church in Denmark (includes Church of Greenland, but not the Church of the Faroe Islands)
 Ecuador
Evangelical Lutheran Church in Ecuador
 El Salvador
Salvadoran Lutheran Church
 Eritrea
Evangelical Church of Eritrea
 Estonia
Estonian Evangelical Lutheran Church
 Ethiopia
Ethiopian Evangelical Church Mekane Yesus (also a member of the Global Confessional and Missional Lutheran Forum)
 Finland
Evangelical Lutheran Church of Finland
 France
Union of Protestant Churches of Alsace and Lorraine
United Protestant Church of France
Malagasy Protestant Church in France
 Ghana
 Evangelical Lutheran Church of Ghana (also a full member of the International Lutheran Council)
 Georgia
Evangelical Lutheran Church in Russia and Other States
 Germany
Church of Lippe, Lutheran Classis
Evangelical Church in Central Germany
Evangelical Lutheran Church in Baden
Evangelical Lutheran Church in Bavaria
Evangelical Lutheran Church in Brunswick
Evangelical Lutheran Church in Northern Germany
Evangelical Lutheran Church in Oldenburg
Evangelical-Lutheran Church in Württemberg
Evangelical Lutheran Church of Hanover
Evangelical Lutheran Church of Saxony
Evangelical Lutheran Church of Schaumburg-Lippe
Latvian Evangelical Lutheran Church Abroad
 Guatemala
Evangelical Lutheran Congregation "La Epifania"
 Guyana
Evangelical Lutheran Church in Guyana
 Hungary
The Evangelical Lutheran Church in Hungary
 Honduras
Christian Lutheran Church of Honduras
 Iceland
The Evangelical Lutheran Church of Iceland
 India
Andhra Evangelical Lutheran Church
Evangelical Lutheran Church in Madhya Pradesh
Evangelical Lutheran Church in the Himalayan States
Good Shepherd Evangelical Lutheran Church
Gossner Evangelical Lutheran Church in Chotanagpur and Assam
India Evangelical Lutheran Church (also a full member of the International Lutheran Council)
Jeypore Evangelical Lutheran Church
Northern Evangelical Lutheran Church
South Andhra Lutheran Church
The Arcot Lutheran Church
The Tamil Evangelical Lutheran Church
 Indonesia
Batak Christian Community Church
Christian Communion of Indonesia Church in Nias
Christian Evangelical Church in Minahasa
Christian Protestant Church in Indonesia
Christian Protestant Angkola Church
Evangelical Church in Kalimantan
Indonesian Christian Lutheran Church (also a member of the Global Confessional and Missional Lutheran Forum)
Pakpak Dairi Christian Protestant Church
Protestant Christian Batak Church
The Protestant Christian Church
Protestant Christian Church in Mentawai
Simalungun Protestant Christian Church
The United Protestant Church

 Ireland
The Lutheran Church in Ireland
 Italy
Lutheran Evangelical Church in Italy
 Japan
Japan Evangelical Lutheran Church
Japan Lutheran Church – associate member church (also a full member of the International Lutheran Council)
Kinki Evangelical Lutheran Church
 Jordan
Evangelical Lutheran Church in Jordan & the Holy Land
 Kazakhstan
Evangelical Lutheran Church in Russia and Other States
 Kenya
Evangelical Lutheran Church in Kenya (also a full member of the International Lutheran Council and a member of the Global Confessional and Missional Lutheran Forum)
Kenya Evangelical Lutheran Church
 Korea, Republic
Lutheran Church in Korea (also a full member of the International Lutheran Council)
 Kyrgyzstan
Evangelical Lutheran Church in Russia and Other States
 Latvia
Evangelical Lutheran Church of Latvia
 Liberia
Lutheran Church in Liberia
 Liechtenstein
Federation of Evangelical Lutheran Churches in Switzerland and the Principality of Liechtenstein
 Lithuania
Evangelical Lutheran Church of Lithuania
 Madagascar
Malagasy Lutheran Church (also a full member of the International Lutheran Council)
 Malawi
Evangelical Lutheran Church in Malawi
 Malaysia
Basel Christian Church of Malaysia
Evangelical Lutheran Church in Malaysia
Lutheran Church in Malaysia and Singapore
The Protestant Church in Sabah
 Mexico
German-Speaking Evangelical Congregation in Mexico
Mexican Lutheran Church
 Mozambique
Evangelical Lutheran Church in Mozambique
 Myanmar
Evangelical Lutheran Church in Myanmar
Lutheran Church of Myanmar
Myanmar Lutheran Church (also an associate member of the International Lutheran Council)
The Mara Evangelical Church
 Namibia
Evangelical Lutheran Church in Namibia (ELCIN)
Evangelical Lutheran Church in Namibia (ELCIN – GELC)
Evangelical Lutheran Church in the Republic of Namibia (ELCRN)
 Nepal
Nepal Northern Evangelical Lutheran Church
 Netherlands
Protestant Church in the Netherlands
 Nicaragua
Nicaraguan Lutheran Church of Faith and Hope
 Nigeria
Lutheran Church in Nigeria
The Lutheran Church of Christ in Nigeria
 Norway
Church of Norway
Evangelical Lutheran Free Church of Norway
 Palestine
Evangelical Lutheran Church in Jordan & the Holy Land
 Peru
Evangelical Lutheran Church in Peru
Peruvian Lutheran Evangelical Church
 Papua New Guinea
Evangelical Lutheran Church of Papua New Guinea
Gutnius Lutheran Church (also a full member of the International Lutheran Council)
 Philippines
Lutheran Church in the Philippines (also a full member of the International Lutheran Council)
 Poland
Evangelical Church of Augsburg Confession in Poland
 Romania
Evangelical Church of the Augsburg Confession in Romania
Evangelical Lutheran Church in Romania
 Russia
Evangelical Lutheran Church in Russia and Other States
Evangelical Lutheran Church of Ingria in Russia (also a full member of the International Lutheran Council)
 Rwanda
Lutheran Church of Rwanda
 Senegal
Lutheran Church of Senegal
 Serbia
Slovak Evangelical Church of the Augsburg Confession in Serbia
 Sierra Leone
Evangelical Lutheran Church in Sierra Leone
 Singapore
Lutheran Church in Singapore
 Slovak Republic
Evangelical Church of the Augsburg Confession in Slovak Republic
 Slovenia
Evangelical Church of the Augsburg Confession in Slovenia
 South Africa
Evangelical Lutheran Church in Southern Africa
Evangelical Lutheran Church in Southern Africa (Cape Church)

Moravian Church in South Africa
 Sri Lanka
Lanka Lutheran Church (also a full member of the International Lutheran Council)
 Suriname
Evangelical Lutheran Church in Suriname
 Sweden
Church of Sweden
 Switzerland
Federation of Evangelical Lutheran Churches in Switzerland and the Principality of Liechtenstein
 Taiwan (Republic of China)
Lutheran Church of Taiwan
Taiwan Lutheran Church
 Tanzania
Evangelical Lutheran Church in Tanzania (also a member of the Global Confessional and Missional Lutheran Forum)
 Thailand
Evangelical Lutheran Church in Thailand
 Ukraine
Evangelical Lutheran Church in Russia and Other States
 United Kingdom
Lutheran Church in Great Britain
The Lutheran Council of Great Britain
 United States of America
Evangelical Lutheran Church in America
 Uruguay
Evangelical Church of the River Plate
Evangelical Lutheran Church in Uruguay
 Uzbekistan
Evangelical Lutheran Church in Russia and Other States
 Venezuela
Evangelical Lutheran Church in Venezuela
Lutheran Church of Venezuela
 Zambia
Evangelical Lutheran Church in Zambia
 Zimbabwe
Evangelical Lutheran Church in Zimbabwe

Views on same-sex unions
Some member denominations have recognized same-gender unions through marriage, a blessing rite, or special prayers. These include the Church of Denmark, Church of Iceland, Church of Norway, Church of Sweden, Evangelical Church in Austria, Evangelical Lutheran Church in America, Evangelical Lutheran Church in Canada, Evangelical Lutheran Church of Chile, Evangelical Lutheran Church of Finland, Evangelical Lutheran Church in Geneva, Evangelical Lutheran Church in Italy, a majority of the churches within the Evangelical Church in Germany, Evangelical Church of the River Plate, Protestant Church in the Netherlands, and the United Protestant Church of France.

On the other side, several churches, including the Ethiopian Evangelical Church Mekane Yesus, Evangelical Lutheran Church in Tanzania, the Malagasy Lutheran Church, the Evangelical Lutheran Church of Latvia and the Evangelical Lutheran Church of Lithuania, which recognize marriage as solely the union between a man and a woman, have broken ties with many of the churches supporting same-gender unions.

The Evangelical Church of the Lutheran Confession in Brazil supports civil same-sex marriage, but does not allow its ministers to celebrate same-gender unions, neither does it ordain ministers who are living in same-gender unions.

See also

 Confessional Evangelical Lutheran Conference
 Global Confessional and Missional Lutheran Forum
 International Lutheran Council
 List of the largest Protestant denominations
 Porvoo Communion
 World Council of Churches

Notes

References

Bibliography

External links

 

International bodies of Lutheran denominations
Christian organizations established in 1947
International bodies of Lutheran denominations (currently existing)